Michael Cerveris (born November 6, 1960)  is an American actor, singer, and guitarist. He has performed in many stage musicals and plays, including several Stephen Sondheim musicals: Assassins, Sweeney Todd, Road Show, and Passion. In 2004, Cerveris won the Tony Award as Best Featured Actor in a Musical for Assassins as John Wilkes Booth. In 2015, he won his second Tony Award as Best Actor in a Musical for Fun Home as Bruce Bechdel.

He was called, by Playbill.com, "arguably the most versatile leading man on Broadway", playing roles from "Shakespeare's Romeo to The Who's Tommy, from the German transsexual rock diva Hedwig in Hedwig and the Angry Inch to the homicidal title character of Sondheim's Sweeney Todd."

Cerveris' most visible television role to date has been as the Observer code-named September in the FOX science fiction television series Fringe. His character, a mysterious man seen attending many unusual events, appeared regularly during the series and became one of the main characters to bring the story to its end.

Early life
Cerveris was born in Bethesda, Maryland, and raised in Huntington, West Virginia. His mother, Marsha (née Laycock), was a dancer, and his father, Michael Cerveris, was an Italian American professor of music; the two met while students at the Juilliard School. He is a 1979 graduate of Phillips Exeter Academy and a 1983 cum laude graduate of Yale University, where he was a member of Skull and Bones. He majored in theater studies, and also studied voice.

Career

Theatre
Broadway and Off-Broadway
Cerveris had roles in several Off-Broadway productions, starting with Macbeth in 1983 as Malcolm and including Total Eclipse in 1985 as Rimbaud at the Westside Theatre, Abingdon Square in 1987 as Frank at the Women's Project, and Blood Sports in 1987 as Nick at the New York Theatre Workshop.

He made his Broadway debut in The Who's Tommy in 1993 as "18-20 year old Tommy/Narrator", receiving a Tony Award nomination as Best Featured Actor in a Musical, Drama League Award nomination, Theater World Award winner, and Original Cast Grammy winner. He had appeared in Tommy in the La Jolla Playhouse prior to Broadway. He next appeared in the Broadway musical Titanic in 1997 as Thomas Andrews. He played the role of John Wilkes Booth in the Broadway musical Assassins in 2004, and won the Tony Award, Best Featured Actor in a Musical and the Outer Critics Circle Award.

In the 2005 Broadway revival of Sweeney Todd: The Demon Barber of Fleet Street Cerveris played the title role, and was nominated for the Tony Award, Drama Desk Award, Outer Critics Circle Award, Drama League Award, and received a Drama Critics Circle citation. In this John Doyle production, the actors also played instruments, with Cerveris playing lyric guitar. In the Broadway musical LoveMusik (2007) he appeared as Kurt Weill, and received Tony, Drama Desk, Outer Critics, and Drama League Award nominations. In 2007 he played Kent in King Lear at the Off-Broadway Public Theater, receiving a Drama League Award nomination. Cerveris played Posthumus Leonatus in the Broadway revival of Cymbeline from December 2, 2007, to January 6, 2008. He appeared Off-Broadway in the Stephen Sondheim-John Weidman musical Road Show at the Public Theater in 2008 as Wilson Mizner. Cerveris appeared opposite Mary-Louise Parker in the limited Roundabout Theatre Company production of Hedda Gabler from January 2009 to March 2009. He next played Dr. Givings in the Broadway comedy by Sarah Ruhl, In the Next Room (or The Vibrator Play), starting in October 2009. From March 2012 to January 2013, Cerveris played Perón in the Broadway revival of Evita. Then, from 2015 to 2016, he played the role of Bruce Bechdel in the Broadway musical Fun Home winning the 2015 Tony Award for Best Performance by an Actor in a Leading Role in a Musical.

 Other venues
In 2000 Cerveris played the lead role of Hedwig in Hedwig and the Angry Inch in the West End. He had previously played the role Off-Broadway from July 8, 1998, to August 4, 1998 and again from February 1999. He was a Garland Award winner, and Ovation Award nominee. During 2002, the Kennedy Center presented a "Sondheim Celebration"; Cerveris appeared in Passion as Giorgio. Cerveris has appeared several times at the Ravinia Festival Concerts (Chicago), including: Passion (2003), Sunday In The Park With George (2004), and Anyone Can Whistle in 2005. He performed in the New York City Center Encores! staged concert of The Apple Tree in 2005, with Kristin Chenoweth.
 
 Regional
 Crow in The Tooth of Crime, Hartford Stage (1985–86)
 Romeo in Romeo and Juliet, opposite Phoebe Cates at the Goodman Theatre (1988)
 Bazarov in Nothing Sacred, Northlight Theatre, Illinois (1988)
 Puck in A Midsummer Night’s Dream, Dallas Theater Center
 Eastern Standard with Tom Hulce, Seattle Repertory Theatre (1988)
 Richard II, Mark Taper Forum (1991–1992)
 Measure for Measure, Old Globe Theatre
 El Dorado, South Coast Repertory (1991)
 A Little Night Music, as Count Carl-Magnus Malcolm, Chicago Shakespeare Theater (December 23, 2003 - January 21, 2004) (Jefferson award nomination)

Film and television
Cerveris has appeared in films such as Lulu on the Bridge (1998), The Mexican (2001), Brief Interviews With Hideous Men (2009), Cirque du Freak: The Vampire's Assistant (2009), Stake Land (2010), Detours (2016), and Ant-Man and the Wasp (2018). His television roles include Ian Ware on Fame, Marvin Frey on Treme, State's Attorney James Castro on The Good Wife, Ramses IV on The Tick, Lazlo Valentin/Professor Pyg on Gotham, and September/The Observer on Fringe. Cerveris also appeared as The Observer at several real-life events covered by FOX as part of a viral marketing campaign for the series. These include appearing in the audience at a taping of American Idol, being shown in the stands at various football and NASCAR events, and a cameo in a commercial for Glee.
Cerveris appeared as Ted Gunn, head of the Behavioral Science Unit in the second season of Mindhunter.

Music career
Cerveris played guitar as a member of Bob Mould's touring band supporting the album The Last Dog And Pony Show. A performance at The Forum in London was recorded and released as BobMouldBand: LiveDog98 (Granary Music 2002). His debut solo album, Dog Eared (Low Heat Records 2004), was co-produced with Adam Lasus and includes guest appearances from Norman Blake (Teenage Fanclub), Corin Tucker and Janet Weiss (Sleater-Kinney), Ken Stringfellow (The Posies, R.E.M.), Steve Shelley (Sonic Youth), Kevin March (Guided by Voices), Anders Parker (Varnaline), and Laura Cantrell. In 2011, Cerveris founded the Americana-Country band Loose Cattle with longtime collaborator Kimberly Kaye. Cerveris and Kaye share vocals in the style of Johnny Cash and June Carter Cash. Known for tongue-in-cheek mashups, country covers, and Cerveris' original songs, the group has gone on to appear at Lincoln Center, Joe's Pub, NPR's Mountain Stage, 54 Below, Chickie Wah Wah's, Siberia, Kajun's Pub, The Blue Note Cafe, Louisiana Music Factory, Rock'n'bowl, Rockwoof Music Hall, Webster Hall, and many others.

He has also contributed vocals to "My Other Phone Is a Boom Car" as part of a ringtone project by They Might Be Giants for Wired Magazine in March 2007. In They Might Be Giants' 2011 release, Join Us, Cerveris also provided vocals for the track, "Three Might Be Duende."

Other activities
Cerveris has performed at many events, to honor or celebrate notable performers and creatives. He performed at The Drama League gala, A Musical Celebration of Broadway on February 7, 2011, which also honored Patti LuPone. In November 2010 he appeared at the Sonnet Repertory Theatre benefit, which honored director Jack O'Brien. On April 27, 2009, he performed at the Signature Theatre gala, a benefit and to celebrate the first annual Sondheim Award.

On December 8, 2010, he took part in the Symphony Space "Selected Shorts and Thalia Book Club" series of readings.

His concert appearances include the Broadway Cabaret Festival, held in October 2010 at The Town Hall (New York).

Personal life
Cerveris was once in a relationship with Beth Ostrosky, an actress who is now married to Howard Stern.

Work

Stage roles

Filmography

Discography
BobMouldBand: LiveDog98 (2002)
Dog Eared (2004)
Piety (2016)

Awards and nominations

References

External links 
 
 
 
 
Yale Daily News: Broadway actor arrives late, entertains Berkeley crowd
Michael Cerveris - Downstage Center interview at American Theatre Wing.org
TonyAwards.com Interview with Michael Cerveris
 Spring 2009 interview with Michael Cerveris at The Sondheim Review

1960 births
20th-century American male actors
21st-century American male actors
Male actors from Maryland
Male actors from West Virginia
American baritones
American male film actors
American male musical theatre actors
American male television actors
American people of Italian descent
Living people
Actors from Huntington, West Virginia
People from Bethesda, Maryland
Phillips Exeter Academy alumni
Tony Award winners
Yale University alumni
Musicians from Huntington, West Virginia